Mar Mar Min (born 18 July 1958) is a Burmese long-distance runner. She competed in the women's marathon at the 1988 Summer Olympics. She was the first woman to represent Myanmar at the Olympics.

References

External links
 

1958 births
Living people
Athletes (track and field) at the 1988 Summer Olympics
Burmese female long-distance runners
Burmese female marathon runners
Olympic athletes of Myanmar
Place of birth missing (living people)
Asian Games medalists in athletics (track and field)
Asian Games bronze medalists for Myanmar
Athletes (track and field) at the 1974 Asian Games
Athletes (track and field) at the 1978 Asian Games
Medalists at the 1974 Asian Games
Southeast Asian Games medalists in athletics
Southeast Asian Games gold medalists for Myanmar
Southeast Asian Games silver medalists for Myanmar
Competitors at the 1977 Southeast Asian Games